The Schenectady Mohawk Giants were a Negro league baseball team in the Eastern Independent Clubs in 1913 and 1914 based in Schenectady, New York. They played their home games at Island Park in 1913 and at Mohawk Park in 1914.

The 1913 club was managed by Phil Bradley, while Chappie Johnson managed the team in 1914.

References

Negro league baseball teams
Baseball teams established in 1913
Baseball teams disestablished in 1914
Defunct baseball teams in New York (state)